The National Trophy (speedway 1931-1964) was a speedway Knockout Cup competition in the United Kingdom for tier one teams.

History
Oxford Cheetahs were the last winners of the National Trophy before it was replaced by the British League Knockout Cup in 1965.

Winners

+ final not held due to outbreak of war, declared joint champions.

See also
Knockout Cup (speedway) for full list of winners and competitions

References

Speedway competitions in the United Kingdom
1931 establishments in the United Kingdom